Senator Halvorson may refer to:

Debbie Halvorson (born 1958), Illinois State Senate
Rod Halvorson (born 1949), Iowa State Senate

See also
Ronald T. Halverson (1936–2017), Utah State Senate